Yumileidi Cumbá Jay (also Yumisleidis, born February 11, 1975, in Guantánamo) is a Cuban shot putter.

Career
Her greatest season was 2004, when she won an Olympic gold medal and achieved a new personal best throw.

Her current personal best throw is 19.97 metres, achieved at the 2004 Ibero-American Championships in Huelva.

Her name is a transliteration of "You Milady", and is in the Cuban tradition of using odd, foreign-born names.

Personal best
Outdoor
Shot put: 19.97 m –  Huelva, 8 August 2004
Indoor
Shot put: 19.31 m –  Budapest, 5 March 2004

International competitions

External links
 
 
 Tilastopaja biography
 Ecured biography (in Spanish)
 Picture of Yumileidi Cumbá as she celebrates winning silver in Olympia

References

1975 births
Living people
Cuban female shot putters
Athletes (track and field) at the 1996 Summer Olympics
Athletes (track and field) at the 2000 Summer Olympics
Athletes (track and field) at the 2004 Summer Olympics
Athletes (track and field) at the 2008 Summer Olympics
Athletes (track and field) at the 1995 Pan American Games
Athletes (track and field) at the 1999 Pan American Games
Athletes (track and field) at the 2003 Pan American Games
Athletes (track and field) at the 2007 Pan American Games
Olympic athletes of Cuba
Olympic gold medalists for Cuba
Sportspeople from Guantánamo
Medalists at the 2004 Summer Olympics
Olympic gold medalists in athletics (track and field)
Pan American Games medalists in athletics (track and field)
Pan American Games gold medalists for Cuba
Pan American Games silver medalists for Cuba
Pan American Games bronze medalists for Cuba
Universiade medalists in athletics (track and field)
Goodwill Games medalists in athletics
Central American and Caribbean Games gold medalists for Cuba
Competitors at the 1993 Central American and Caribbean Games
Competitors at the 1998 Central American and Caribbean Games
Competitors at the 2006 Central American and Caribbean Games
Universiade gold medalists for Cuba
Universiade silver medalists for Cuba
Central American and Caribbean Games medalists in athletics
Medalists at the 1999 Summer Universiade
Medalists at the 2001 Summer Universiade
Competitors at the 2001 Goodwill Games
Medalists at the 1995 Pan American Games
Medalists at the 1999 Pan American Games
Medalists at the 2003 Pan American Games
Medalists at the 2007 Pan American Games
20th-century Cuban women
20th-century Cuban people
21st-century Cuban women